Navtilos is a small volcanic islet of the Sea of Crete. The islet is located about 30 km southeast of the port of Kapsali on the island of Kythira, and 6 km northwest of the northern tip of Antikythira.

Islands of Greece
Landforms of Islands (regional unit)
Islands of Attica
Ionian Islands